Jack's Urban Meeting Place (JUMP) is a creative activity center in Boise, Idaho, with facilities for public meetings, workshops, and exhibition space. An amphitheater and multi-purpose studios for art, movement, and cooking are included. A collection of 52 tractors are on display at various locations in the facility.

History
Planning for JUMP began in 1999 as a museum of agriculture sponsored by Boise agribusiness magnate J. R. Simplot. The museum was envisioned to include some of the 150 pieces of farm equipment Simplot had purchased in 1998 from the collection of Oscar O. Cooke. The plan evolved into a creative facility, and after Simplot's death in 2008, the J.R. Simplot Family Foundation proposed building a $100 million park and museum with studio space and meeting facilities. City planners rejected the idea as incompatible with development goals.

The foundation proposed a combined museum and new Boise Public Library, but again the plan was rejected. In 2012, city planners approved construction of a $70 million facility that included an urban park, a  building, and the tractor exhibit. More than three years after groundbreaking, Jack's Urban Meeting Place opened in December 2015.

Architecture
The architectural firm of Adamson Associates designed JUMP with five intersecting grid patterns, with components of a 6-story main building slightly skewed around a central ramp area in the parking garage. Hoffman Construction Company, the main contractor, encountered delays attributed to the design, perhaps the most complicated project in Boise construction history.

In 2018, JUMP received the best overall project award by the City of Boise and the Building Owners and Managers Association of Idaho.

See also
 Downtown Boise

References

External links

 Infrastructure, Jump & Simplot HQ, Capital City Development Corp.
 Mark Mendiola, Urban facility continues ag legend’s vision, Western Livestock Journal, August 13, 2018

Boise, Idaho
Buildings and structures completed in 2015
Event venues in Idaho